La Casina is a historic commercial building located in Jamaica, Queens. New York City.  It was originally built about 1907 and completely redesigned about 1936 in the Streamline Moderne style. It is a one-story building designed for use as a nightclub.  It has a streamlined facade in the form of a stepped pyramid or ziggurat.  The building retains its original vertical neon sign.  From the 1940s through 1987, the building housed a clothing factory.

It was listed on the National Register of Historic Places in 1990, and a New York City Landmark in 1996.

See also
List of New York City Designated Landmarks in Queens
National Register of Historic Places listings in Queens County, New York

References

Commercial buildings on the National Register of Historic Places in New York City
Art Deco architecture in Queens, New York
Commercial buildings completed in 1934
Commercial buildings in Queens, New York
Jamaica, Queens
New York City Designated Landmarks in Queens, New York
National Register of Historic Places in Queens, New York
Streamline Moderne architecture in New York City
1934 establishments in New York City